Heidy Marleny Juárez Guzmán (born May 14, 1977 in Los Angeles) is a Guatemalan taekwondo practitioner, who competed in the women's welterweight category. She picked up a total of eight medals in her career, including a silver from the 2007 Pan American Games in Rio de Janeiro, Brazil, and a bronze from the 1995 World Taekwondo Championships in Manila, Philippines, and finished fourth in the 67-kg division at the 2004 Summer Olympics, narrowly missing a chance to become Guatemala's first ever Olympic medalist in history.

Juarez qualified for the Guatemalan squad in the women's welterweight class (67 kg) at the 2004 Summer Olympics in Athens, by placing second behind Puerto Rico's Ineabelle Díaz and granting a berth from the Pan American Olympic Qualifying Tournament in Querétaro, Mexico. She opened her match with a superb 7–0 victory over Australia's Caroline Bartasek, before dropping a 4–6 decision to the local favorite Elisavet Mystakidou of Greece by the powerful commotion of the home crowd in the quarterfinals. In the repechage rounds, Juarez came strong from her premature exit to edge New Zealand's Verina Wihongi 4–1, and then yielded her revenge over Puerto Rican fighter Ineabelle Díaz for a 5–2 victory to mount a chance for Guatemala's first ever Olympic medal, but she failed to salvage it in a 2–5 defeat to South Korea's Hwang Kyung-seon.

At the 2007 Pan American Games in Rio de Janeiro, Brazil, Juarez improved her feat from a fourth-place Olympic finish by picking up a silver medal in the women's 67-kg division, losing the final 2–8 to Canada's Karine Sergerie.

References

External links
 
 
 
 

1977 births
Living people
Guatemalan female taekwondo practitioners
Olympic taekwondo practitioners of Guatemala
Taekwondo practitioners at the 2004 Summer Olympics
Pan American Games medalists in taekwondo
Pan American Games gold medalists for Guatemala
Pan American Games silver medalists for Guatemala
Taekwondo practitioners at the 2007 Pan American Games
Taekwondo practitioners at the 1999 Pan American Games
Sportspeople from Guatemala City
Medalists at the 1999 Pan American Games
Medalists at the 2007 Pan American Games
20th-century Guatemalan women
21st-century Guatemalan women